The Hickey Underworld is a Belgian alternative rock band from Antwerp. They named themselves after a song that appears on the album Plays Pretty for Baby, by Washington D.C. post-punk rockers Nation of Ulysses. In 2006, the band won Belgium's influential Humo's Rock Rally.
In 2009, they released their self-titled debut album The Hickey Underworld. Their second album I'm Under The House, I'm Dying was released in 2012.

Members

 Younes Faltakh (Vocals, Guitar)
 Tim Vanhamel (Guitar)
 Jimmy Wouters (Drums)
 Yorgos Tsakiridis (Bass)

Discography

Studio albums
 The Hickey Underworld (2009)
 I'm Under The House, I'm Dying (2012)
 III (2015)

Singles
 Mystery Bruise (2008)
 Future Words (2009)
 High On A Wire (2009)
 Blonde Fire (2009)
 Whistling (2012)
 The Frog (2012)
 High School Lawyer (2015)

References

External links
 

Belgian alternative rock groups
Belgian rock music groups
Musicians from Antwerp